1842 in sports describes the year's events in world sport.

Boxing
Events
 William "Bendigo" Thompson contemplates a comeback but no one will challenge Ben Caunt for his English Championship.

Cricket
Events
 6 August — formation of the original Kent County Cricket Club in Canterbury (it will be reformed as the present club in 1859).  
 25, 26 & 27 August — the new Kent CCC plays its inaugural first-class match v. All-England at the White Hart Ground, Bromley
England
 Most runs – Nicholas Felix 406 @ 31.23 (HS 88)
 Most wickets – William Hillyer 127 @ 13.42 (BB 8–?)

Horse racing
England
 Grand National – Gaylad
 1,000 Guineas Stakes – Firebrand
 2,000 Guineas Stakes – Meteor
 The Derby – Attila
 The Oaks – Our Nell 
 St. Leger Stakes – Blue Bonnet

Rowing
The Boat Race
 11 June — Oxford wins the 6th Oxford and Cambridge Boat Race
Other events
 The first American collegiate rowing club is established at Yale University on the Thames River (Connecticut)

References

 
Sports by year